The Washington D.C. Area Film Critics Association Award for Best Supporting Actress is one of the annual awards given by the Washington D.C. Area Film Critics Association.

Winners and nominees

2000s

2010s

2020s

Actress, Best Supporting
Film awards for supporting actress